William Creech FRSE (12 May 1745 – 14 January 1815) was a Scottish publisher, printer, bookseller and politician. For 40 years Creech was the chief publisher in Edinburgh. He published the first Edinburgh edition of Robert Burns' poems, and Sir John Sinclair's influential "Statistical Accounts of Scotland". In publishing Creech often went under the pseudonym of Theophrastus.

Life

William was the son of Rev William Creech, a minister in Newbattle, Midlothian and his wife, Mary Buley. His father died when he was four months old and William spent time with his mother in both Perth and Dalkeith. He was educated at Dalkeith Grammar School then studied medicine at Edinburgh University.

For two years (1766 to 1768) he travelled with William Strahan and Thomas Cadell to London and the continent, both France and Holland. After some time back in Edinburgh he went on a Grand Tour with Lord Kilmaurs in 1770, visiting France, Germany, Switzerland and Holland.

His mother struck up a friendship with Alexander Kincaid and thereafter he trained as an apprentice printer in the firm of Kincaid  & Bell. In 1771 he went into partnership with his former master (and erstwhile stepfather), Alexander Kincaid. Kincaid was a publisher (and later Lord Provost of Edinburgh) who had purchased Allan Ramsay's bookshop in the Luckenbooths next to St. Giles Cathedral. In 1773 Kincaid gave Creech the bookshop to concentrate on the printing side of his work. The building soon thereafter became known as "Creech's Land", Creech staying here for 44 years. Burn's poems were published from this building.

He was elected a Fellow of the Royal Society of Edinburgh in 1784 (in the first intake of members following its foundation in 1783). His proposers were Andrew Dalzell, James Gregory and Alexander Fraser Tytler. In 1786 he was a founder member of the Edinburgh Chamber of Commerce.

In 1786, John 15th Lord Glencairn introduced Creech to Robert Burns an important alliance was created, leading to Creech printing and selling the famous Edinburgh Editions of Burns' poems in 1787, 1793 and 1794. Creech is one of the very small and elite group to have had two poems written about him by Robert Burns: Lament for the Absence of William Creech (usually called "Willie's Awa'"), marking Creech's absence from Edinburgh to visit London: and On William Creech, a short, sharp poem following an argument.

In 1788 he was a member of the jury in Deacon William Brodie's trial for robbery. Within days, his account of the trial and execution was for sale in his High Street bookshop.

Serving as a Councillor from 1780 and Bailie from 1807, he served as Edinburgh's Lord Provost from 1811 to 1813.

Creech never married and had no children. He is buried at Greyfriars Kirkyard, Edinburgh in the western extension, midway along the western path.

A plaque to his, and his father's, memory can be seen at Newbattle Kirk.

He lived at the head of Craigs Close on the Royal Mile until around 1800. The house was formerly the property of the printer Andro Hart. He then moved to 5 George Street in the new Town for his final years.

Creech's land (his shop) was demolished in 1817 to allow vehicles to pass on the north side of St Giles Cathedral.

He died at home in Edinburgh and is buried in the western extension of Greyfriars Kirkyard.

Self Publications

Creech occasionally wrote the books which he published. The most notable are:

Account of the Trial of Deacon Brodie (1788)
Edinburgh's Fugitive Pieces (1815)

Business Connections and Friendships

Due to Creech's position and standing he held a unique and pivotal role within the Scottish Enlightenment and had both business relationships and friendships with many of the Edinburgh literati.

His most notable relationships include: Robert Burns, whom he published (their relationship, however, was eventually spoiled due to a misunderstanding about Publishing royalties), Lord Kames, Hugh Blair, James Beattie and Dugald Stewart.

Notes

References
Barbara M. Benedict, ‘Creech, William (1745–1815)’, Oxford Dictionary of National Biography, Oxford University Press, 2004. Retrieved 24 July 2008

1745 births
1815 deaths
Publishers (people) from Edinburgh
Lord Provosts of Edinburgh
Burials at Greyfriars Kirkyard
Scottish book publishers (people)
Scottish booksellers
Scottish printers
Fellows of the Royal Society of Edinburgh
Alumni of the University of Edinburgh
18th-century Scottish people
19th-century Scottish people